Events from the year 1801 in Russia

Events

 Free Society of Lovers of Literature, Science, and the Arts
 Olonets Governorate
 Penza Governorate

Births

Deaths

 
 
 
 Paul I of Russia

References

1801 in Russia
Years of the 19th century in the Russian Empire